The 2003–04 season was the 103rd season in Athletic Bilbao's history and their 73rd consecutive season in La Liga, the top division of Spanish football.

Season summary

At the end of the previous season, head coach Jupp Heynckes left his position to return to his native Germany as manager of Schalke 04. B team coach Ernesto Valverde, who also represented Athletic during his playing career, was promoted in his place.

Valverde's first season in charge saw a successful La Liga campaign, as Bilbao finished in fifth place and qualified for the 2004–05 UEFA Cup. This constituted their best league placing and first European qualification for six years.

Athletic were somewhat less successful in the Copa del Rey, suffering a humiliating defeat in their first match at the hands of Segunda División B side Gimnástica de Torrelavega. This marked their earliest exit from the cup since 1993–94.

Squad statistics

Appearances and goals

|}

Results

La Liga

League table

See also
2003–04 La Liga
2003–04 Copa del Rey

External links

References

Athletic Bilbao
Athletic Bilbao seasons